Bletso may refer to:

Andrew St John, 21st Baron St John of Bletso (1918–1978), English peer
Anthony St John, 22nd Baron St John of Bletso (born 1957), British peer, businessman and solicitor
Baron Beauchamp of Bletso, title in the Peerage of England
Baron St John of Bletso, in the County of Bedford, is a title in the Peerage of England
Beauchamp St John, 17th Baron St John of Bletso (1844–1912), English peer
Henry St John, 18th Baron St John of Bletso DL (1876–1920), English peer
John St John, 11th Baron St John of Bletso (died 1757), British peer
John St John, 20th Baron St John of Bletso (1917–1976), English peer
John St John, 2nd Baron St John of Bletso (died 1596), English peer
Margaret Beauchamp of Bletso (1405–1482), the daughter of John, Baron Beauchamp of Bletso
Mowbray St John, 19th Baron St John of Bletso (1877–1934), English peer
Oliver St John, 1st Baron St John of Bletso (died 1582), English peer
Oliver St John, 5th Baron St John of Bletso (1603–1642), English politician and Parliamentarian Army officer
St Andrew St John, 14th Baron St John of Bletso (1759–1817), member of the British House of Commons
St Andrew St John, 15th Baron St John of Bletso (1811–1874), English peer
St Andrew St John, 16th Baron St John of Bletso (1840–1887), English peer